Sir James Moray Stewart, KCB (born 1938) is a retired British civil servant. Educated at the University of Keele, he entered the civil service in 1962 as an official in the Air Ministry; he served there and in its successor, the Ministry of Defence, where he was promoted to deputy secretary in 1986 and then Second Permanent Secretary in 1990, serving until 1996.

References 

1938 births
Living people
British civil servants
Alumni of Keele University
Knights Companion of the Order of the Bath